Portalites is an extinct genus of acritarchs. The species Portalites gondwanensis was located in outcrop Morro do Papaléo in the town of Mariana Pimentel in Brazil, the geopark Paleorrota. The outcrop is in the Rio Bonito Formation and date from Sakmarian in the Permian.

References 

Acritarch genera
Permian life